Sökmen (also called Muineddin Sokman,  Muʿīn ad-Dīn Soqman or Soqman ibn Ortoq)  was a Turkmen bey of the Seljuk Empire in the early 12th century.

Origin

His father was Artuk, a commander in the Seljuk Empire. He supported Tutush I, a member of the Seljukid house whose province was Greater Syria. Tutush appointed him as the governor of Jerusalem. After his death in 1091, Sökmen and his brother Ilghazi became the co-governors of the city. However, Sökmen lost his position when Jerusalem was taken by the Fatimids in 1098. Sökmen abandoned the city and moved to north.

In Anatolia and Syria
Even before the loss of Jerusalem, Sökmen spent much of his time in Anatolia and Syria. After Tutush's death in 1095, Sökmen took service with Ridwan of Aleppo, Tutush's son. Sökmen made use of the fight between Ridwan and his brother Duqaq to a gain a territory of his own around Suruç (now a district center in Şanlıurfa Province of Turkey).

In 1098, the Seljuk Empire formed an army under the command of Kerbogha of Musul to assist Yağısıyan during the siege of Antioch. Sökmen took part in this army. But the campaign was a failure and the army arrived a few days after Aleppo surrendered. In 1101, Baldwin I of Jerusalem captured Suruç.

Sökmen’s beylik
Kerbogha died in 1102 and during the ensuing struggle to control Musul, Sökmen supported Musa, the viceroy of Musul. For his services, Musa granted the city Hasankeyf to Sökmen. Sökmen founded a small beylik around Hasankeyf. This beylik is now considered one of the three Arkukid beyliks. (The other two were İlghazi's Mardin beylik and Harput beylik.) The Hasankeyf beylik survived through 1231.

After being a bey, he supported his brother Ilghazi who had recently been dismissed from his post as a Seljukid shihna in Baghdad. In 1104, in the battle of Harran he defeated a Crusader army. In this battle he took Baldwin II of Jerusalem and Joscelin I captive.

Death
Toghtekin, the ruler of Damascus asked Sökmen to support him against the Crusaders. Sökmen agreed; but on the way to Damascus, at al-Qaryatayn, he died of a pertussis in October 1104.

Citations

Sources

 

11th-century births
1104 deaths
Artuqids
Turkic rulers
Medieval Jerusalem
Muslims of the First Crusade
Hasankeyf District
Deaths from whooping cough
Government officials of the Seljuk Empire
11th-century Turkic people